The Shiva hypothesis, also known as coherent catastrophism, is the idea that global natural catastrophes on Earth, such as extinction events, happen at regular intervals because of the periodic motion of the Sun in relation to the Milky Way galaxy.

Initial proposal in 1979
William Napier and Victor Clube in their 1979 Nature article, ”A Theory of Terrestrial Catastrophism”, proposed the idea that gravitational disturbances caused by the Solar System crossing the plane of the Milky Way galaxy are enough to disturb comets in the Oort cloud surrounding the Solar System. This sends comets in towards the inner Solar System, which raises the chance of an impact. According to the hypothesis, this results in the Earth experiencing large impact events about every 30 million years (such as the Cretaceous–Paleogene extinction event).

Later work by Rampino
Starting in 1984, Michael R. Rampino published followup research on the hypothesis. Certainly Rampino was aware of Napier and Clube's earlier publication, as Rampino and Stothers' letter to Nature in 1984 references it.

In the 1990s, Rampino and Bruce Haggerty renamed Napier and Clube's Theory of Terrestrial Catastrophism after Shiva, the Hindu god of destruction.  In 2020, Rampino and colleagues published non-marine evidence corroborating previous marine evidence in support of the Shiva hypothesis.

Similar theories
The Sun's passage through the higher density spiral arms of the galaxy, rather than its passage through the plane of the galaxy, could hypothetically coincide with mass extinction on Earth.
However, a reanalysis of the effects of the Sun's transit through the spiral structure based on CO data has failed to find a correlation.

The Shiva Hypothesis may have inspired yet another theory: that a brown dwarf named Nemesis causes extinctions every 26 million years, which varies slightly from 30 million years.

See also
 Local Bubble
 Tyche (hypothetical planet)

References

External links
 Napier and Clube's 1979 article "A Theory of Terrestrial Catastrophism"
 A description of the Shiva hypothesis by Michael Rampino
 Asteroid/Comet Impact Craters and Mass Extinctions and Shiva Hypothesis of Periodic Mass Extinctions, by Michael Paine
 The "Shiva Hypothesis": Impacts, Mass Extinctions, and the Galaxy, by Rampino and Haggerty
 The Shiva hypothesis: impacts, mass extinctions, and the Galaxy, by Rampino, M. R.
 The correlation between mas extinctions and impacts of near-Earth objects. The review of Shiva hypothesis, by Yang Su, Yi Xia and Yanan Zhang.

Hypothetical impact events